Jędrychowo may refer to:

Jędrychowo, Braniewo County in Warmian-Masurian Voivodeship (north Poland)
Jędrychowo, Iława County in Warmian-Masurian Voivodeship (north Poland)
Jędrychowo, Mrągowo County in Warmian-Masurian Voivodeship (north Poland)
Jędrychowo, Ostróda County in Warmian-Masurian Voivodeship (north Poland)